is a Japanese activist, philanthropist, and educator. He is the founder and president of Ashinaga and the founder and headmaster of Kokorojuku dormitory.

Early life 

Yoshiomi Tamai was born in Ikeda, Osaka, on 6 February 1935 in 1958, he graduated from Shiga University with a degree in economics. In 1961, he left his job at a brokerage firm to pursue a career in economic journalism. In 1964, Tamai's mother died after being involved in a traffic accident caused by a reckless driver. At that time, Tamai decided he would become Japan's first "traffic critic." Over the next few years, his wife was diagnosed with cancer and passed away at 29 years old. These two losses were the starting point for Tamai's work on the Ashinaga movement.

Association for Traffic Accident Orphans 

In 1966, Tamai began appearing as a regular guest in a weekly traffic accident prevention corner on the Katsura Kokinji Afternoon Show (TV Asahi), showcasing problems such as the rise in auto insurance premiums and campaigning for the introduction of corporate manslaughter in the Penal Code of Japan. In October 1968, Tamai and Shinji Okajima, who had lost his sister and nephew in a traffic accident, launched the Association to Support Traffic Accidents Orphans and held their first street fundraising campaign in Tokyo. In 1969, the overwhelming public reaction to the collection of poems by traffic accident orphans Tengoku ni iru otōsama (My Father Is in Heaven) prompted the House of Representatives' Budget Committee to formally establish an Association for Traffic Accidents Orphans. The association's purpose was to provide high-school and university students who had lost one or both parents in traffic accidents with student loans. Tamai was appointed as executive director of the association, while Shigeo Nagano, who used to appear with him on the Katsura Kokinji Afternoon Show, was appointed as president. Among the young talents Tamai recruited into the organization, there were future National Diet members Takashi Yamamoto and Osamu Fujimura.

Kokorojuku and Ashinaga 

In 1978, Tamai founded the Kokorojuku dormitory in Hino, Tokyo and was appointed as its headmaster. In 1989, he won the Asahi Shimbun Social Welfare Award. Around this time, a part of the Association for Traffic Accident Orphans began accusing Tamai of disloyalty for his interest in supporting other orphaned students, such as those who lost their parents to natural disasters. At the same time, some former Government bureaucrats who were working in the organization fell under suspicion of being too heavily influenced by their political affiliations. Tamai, who opposed the presence of revolving door personnel, ultimately decided to create a new, strictly non-political association in support of all orphaned students. The new organization, established in 1993, was named Ashinaga. Yutaka Takeda, then-CEO of Nippon Steel, was appointed as president of Ashinaga, while Tamai himself was appointed as vice-president.

Other philanthropic work 

After the Great Hanshin Earthquake of 1995, Tamai started working on providing support for children who had lost one or both parents in the disaster, as well as conducting a comprehensive survey of all previous student loan recipients. In 1998, he took on the role of president at Ashinaga. In 1999, Ashinaga raised funds from donors in over 150 foreign countries, as well as Japan, and used these resources to build Rainbow House, a facility for the emotional care of orphaned children in Kobe. Since 2000, Tamai has been working to reduce extreme poverty in the world and he has established Rainbow Houses in several developing countries. He has also organized a number of international meetings for orphans of war, terrorism, AIDS, and natural disasters. In June 2010, his collection of essays Dakara, Ashinaga undō wa suteki da (The Beauty of the Ashinaga Movement) was published for Hihyōsha's "Psycho Critique 13" series. In 2011, after the Great Tohoku Earthquake and Tsunami, Tamai announced the construction of three new Rainbow Houses in Tohoku. Since 2012, Tamai has worked on developing the Ashinaga Africa Initiative, a project that aims to support the higher education of orphaned students from 49 countries in Sub-Saharan Africa. The goal of this project is to foster future leaders who will bring positive change to their home countries and work to reduce poverty in the region.

Recognition

Awards
1989: Asahi Shimbun Social Welfare Award
1995: Brazilian Order of Rio Branco Medal
2003: Asahi Shimbun Social Welfare Award
2012: Global Award for Fundraising
2015: Eleanor Roosevelt Award for Human Rights
2016: Eiji Yoshikawa Culture Award

Bibliography

Author
 (The Art of Stock Trading According to 100 Experts), Dōbunkan Shuppan, 1963
 (Traffic's Sacrificial Victims: Tracing the Dreadful True State of Traffic Accidents in Japan) Kōbundō, 1965
 (The Companion to Economics and Market Conditions), Dōbunkan Shuppan, 1966
 (Settled Out of Court: What We Know about Traffic Accidents), Ushio Shuppansha, Ushio Shinsho, 1966 (a revised edition was published in 1968)
 (Walk Slow, Japan: How Cars Destroy the Planet), Saimaru Shuppankai, 1973
 (The Beauty of the Ashinaga Movement), Psycho Critique 13, Hihyōsha, 2010

Editor
 (A Dictionary of Financing, Security, and Commodity Market Terminology), Dōbunkan Shuppan, 1965 (with Aomizu Masaki)
 (My Father Is in Heaven), Saimaru Shuppankai, 1968
 (Living for Tomorrow: Writings for Our Youth), Saimaru Shuppankai, 1971
 (Mommy, Let's Do Our Best! A Sequel to My Father Is in Heaven), Saimaru Shuppankai, 1974 
 (My Father Is in Heaven: Revised Edition), Saimaru Shuppankai, 1977
 (The Day My Mother Cried), Saimaru Shuppankai, 1979
 (Tales of Ashinaga Ojisan), Saimaru Shuppankai, 1985
 (A Fifteen-year History of the Association for Traffic Accident Orphans), Saimaru Shuppankai, 1985
 (The Horror of Disasters: Essays by Orphans of Natural Disasters), Saimaru Shuppankai, 1986

Further reading
 (Yoshiomi Tamai and the Ashinaga Movement), Yoshiya Soeda, Iwanami Shoten, 2003
 (Work Hard and Aim High! All there is to know about Yoshiomi Tamai and the Ashinaga Movement), Media Watch 100, Dōjidaisha, 2012

References

External links 
 Ashinaga's Website

1935 births
Living people
People from Osaka
Japanese activists
Japanese philanthropists